The Toronto Rock are a lacrosse team based in Hamilton, Ontario playing in the National Lacrosse League (NLL). The 2022 season is the 24th in franchise history, and 23rd as the Rock. This was the second team season in Hamilton and the first since 1998 following a move from Toronto.

Regular season

Final standings

Game log

Regular season

Playoffs

Roster

Entry Draft
The 2021 NLL Entry Draft took place on August 28, 2021. The Toronto Rock made the following selections:

References

Toronto
Toronto Rock